Beacon Hill School may refer to:

United Kingdom
 Beacon Hill Academy, formerly Beacon Hill School, is a coeducational special school with academy status in South Ockendon, Essex, UK
 Beacon Hill Community School, a secondary school in Aspatria, Cumbria, UK
 Beacon Hill School, founded by Bertrand Russell and Dora Russell, from 1927 to 1943
 Beacon Hill School, a special or alternative school in North Tyneside, UK
 Beacon Hill Primary School, Kesgrave, Suffolk, UK
 Unity Academy Blackpool, formerly Beacon Hill School, in the Warbreck area of Blackpool, Lancashire, UK
 Matthew Humberstone School, formerly Beacon Hill Secondary School, a comprehensive school in Cleethorpes, North East Lincolnshire, UK

Other places
 Beacon Hill School, Hong Kong, an international primary school
 Beacon Hill Secondary School, in the Western Cape, South Africa
 Beacon Hill High School, a former high school in Beacon Hill, Sydney, Australia
 El Centro de la Raza, an educational, cultural, and social service agency, at the former Beacon Hill Elementary School, Seattle, Washington, U.S.

See also
Beacon Hill (disambiguation)